Björn Heinrich Walter Bregy (born September 30, 1974) is a Swiss heavyweight kickboxer, European Yoseikan Budo Champion and K-1 Europe 2006 in Amsterdam tournament Champion.
He holds notable wins over Gokhan Saki, Ray Sefo, Alexander Ustinov, Freddy Kemayo (twice), and Alexey Ignashov.

Career
Bregy made his K-1 debut on June 3, 2000 at K-1 Fight Night 2000 in Zürich, Switzerland, against Reinhard Ulz. He won the fight by 2 round KO.

On May 21, 2005, in Stockholm, Sweden, Bregy beat all three opponents Pavel Majer, Denis Grigoriev and Gary Turner and won his first K-1 tournament title. In 2006 Bregy continued his strong performance in K-1 World GP in Amsterdam, winning the tournament by three consecutive KO's over Freddy Kemayo, Naoufal Benazzouz and Gokhan Saki and qualified himself for K-1 World GP Final Elimination 2006 in Osaka, Japan. He was matched up against the defending K-1 World champion Semmy Schilt, and lost the fight by first round left hook KO.

On February 9, 2008 at K-1 Europe Elimination GP in Budapest, Hungary, Bregy knocked out Paula Mataele and qualified for the K-1 European GP held in Amsterdam, Netherlands.

On April 26, 2008 Bregy participated on his third consecutive K-1 European GP. He knocked out South African Jan Nortje in quarterfinals and was stopped by Errol Zimmerman in semis at the end of third round by a flurry of punches.

Titles
 2007 K-1 World Grand Prix in Amsterdam Runner Up
 2006 K-1 World Grand Prix in Amsterdam Champion
 2005 K-1 Scandinavia Grand Prix Champion
 2003 K-1 World Grand Prix in Basel Runner Up
 WKA European Heavyweight Champion
 World Champion Yoseikan - budo

Kickboxing record (Incomplete)

See also
 List of K-1 events
 List of K-1 champions
 List of male kickboxers

References

External links
 Profile at K-1
 Mike's Gym official site

1974 births
Living people
Swiss male kickboxers
Heavyweight kickboxers
People from Sion, Switzerland
Swiss expatriates in the Netherlands
SUPERKOMBAT kickboxers
Sportspeople from Valais